Sylvia Ostry  (June 3, 1927 – May 7, 2020) was a Canadian economist and public servant.

Life
Born Sylvia Knelman in Winnipeg, Manitoba on June 3, 1927, she received a Bachelor of Arts in economics from McGill University in 1948, a Master of Arts from McGill in 1950, and eventually earned her PhD from Girton College, Cambridge in 1954.

After studying at the University of Cambridge, she was a lecturer at McGill, becoming an assistant professor from 1952 to 1955, and becoming Associate Professor at the Université de Montréal from 1962 to 1964.

From 1972 to 1975, Ostry was Chief Statistician of Canada at Statistics Canada. From 1975 to 1978, Ostry was Deputy Minister, Consumer and Corporate Affairs. From 1978 to 1979, she was Chairman, Economic Council of Canada. From 1979 to 1983, she was Head of the Department of Economics and Statistics of the Organisation for Economic Co-operation and Development, Paris. From 1984 to 1985 she was Deputy Minister, International Trade, and Coordinator, International Economic Relations.  Later, in 1986 Ostry became a member of the influential Washington-based financial advisory body, the Group of Thirty. During the 1988 G7 Summit in Toronto, Ostry served as Canada's sherpa.

From 1991 to 1996, she was Chancellor, University of Waterloo. In 1997 she was appointed Chancellor Emerita, University of Waterloo.

From 1990 to 1997, she was Chair of the University of Toronto's Centre for International Studies. Since then she has been a Distinguished Research Fellow there.

She was married to the late Bernard Ostry, with whom she had two children, Adam Ostry (a senior federal civil servant himself) and Jonathan D. Ostry (Deputy Director, Research Department, International Monetary Fund). She died in Toronto on Thursday May 7, 2020.

Awards
 In 1972 she was elected as a Fellow of the American Statistical Association
 In 1978 she was made an Officer of the Order of Canada
 In 1987 she received the Government of Canada Outstanding Achievement Award
 In 1990 she was promoted to Companion of the Order of Canada.
 In 1991 she was made a Fellow of the Royal Society of Canada
 In 2009 she was made a Member of the Order of Manitoba.
 In 2010 she was awarded The Couchiching Award for Public Policy Leadership

Honours
 Ostry was awarded 18 honorary Doctorate of Laws degrees from:
 University of New Brunswick in 1971
 York University in 1971
 McGill University in 1972
 University of Western Ontario in 1973
 McMaster University in 1973
 University of British Columbia in 1973
 Queen's University in 1975
 Brock University in 1975
 Mount Allison University in 1975
 Acadia University in 1981
 American College of Switzerland in 1983
 University of Winnipeg in 1984
 University of Manitoba in 1986
 Concordia University (Montreal) in 1986
 University of Windsor in 1987
 University of Waterloo in 1997
 a Doctorate of Management Sciences from University of Ottawa in 1976
 a Doctorate of Letters from Laurentian University in 1977

In 1997, a lecture series was begun in her honour by Sadako Ogata, UN High Commissioner for Refugees. Some of the lectures in the series were published in a book in 2003.

Select publications 
 Summitry: The Medium and the Message. Bissell Paper No. 3. Toronto: University of Toronto, Centre for International Studies, 1988
 Canada, Europe and the Economic Summits. Paper presented at the All-European Canadian Studies Conference, The Hague, October 24–27, 1990. Unpublished in print
 Globalization and the G8: could Kananaskis set a new direction?. O.D. Skelton Memorial Lecture, Queen's University, March 2002. Unpublished in print

Further reading
 Ostry at Jewish Women: A Comprehensive Historical Encyclopedia JWA, by Michael Brown, 2009

See also
 List of University of Waterloo people

References

External links 
 Sylvia Ostry archival papers held at the University of Toronto Archives and Records Management Services
 

1927 births
2020 deaths
Canadian economists
Jewish Canadian scientists
Chancellors of the University of Waterloo
Companions of the Order of Canada
Canadian women economists
Fellows of the American Statistical Association
Fellows of the Royal Society of Canada
McGill University alumni
Members of the Order of Manitoba
Scientists from Manitoba
Alumni of Girton College, Cambridge
People from Winnipeg
University of Toronto people